Jeff Reed may refer to:

 Jeff Reed (baseball) (born 1962), American baseball catcher
 Jeff Reed (American football) (born 1979), American football place kicker
 Jeff Reed, candidate in the 2010 United States House of Representatives elections in Missouri

See also
Geoffrey Reed (1892–1970), Australian judge